= Federation of Building and Wood Workers =

Trade union of construction workers in Cambodia

FBWW
- Founded: 2001
- Location: Cambodia
- Members: 654 (2015)

The Federation of Building and Wood Workers (FBWW) is a trade union of mainly construction workers in Cambodia. The union was established in 2001 and represents 654 members. FBWW is affiliated with the Cambodia Confederation of Trade Unions. The union shares office space with the Cambodian Unions Federation, on which it also depends for financial support.
